Dariusz Jarecki (born 23 March 1981 in Barlinek) is a Polish footballer who currently plays for Stal Rzeszów II.

Successes

Jagiellonia Białystok
 Polish Cup: 2009–10

Career

Club
In June 2011, he joined LKS Nieciecza.

References

External links
 
 

Polish footballers
Association football midfielders
Polonia Bytom players
Górnik Łęczna players
Jagiellonia Białystok players
Bruk-Bet Termalica Nieciecza players
Stal Rzeszów players
I liga players
II liga players
III liga players
Ekstraklasa players
1981 births
Living people
People from Barlinek
Sportspeople from West Pomeranian Voivodeship